Spokane Bridge  is an unincorporated community and former census-designated place in Spokane County, in the U.S. state of Washington. The community is located on the banks of the Spokane River at the Washington–Idaho border, just south of Interstate 90. The city of Stateline, Idaho is located across the river to the northeast. The community was the site of the first post office in Spokane County

History
In 1864, Joe Herring, Timothy Lee, and Ned Jordan built the first bridge over the Spokane River and called it the Pioneer Bridge.

The first settlement in the region, which came to be known as Spokane Bridge, began to build up near the bridge, and included the first store, the first house, the first hotel, and the first post office in the region. M. M. Cowley bought out Charley Kendall in 1872, after AC Kendall became sick, which included the bridge, a store and other out buildings totaling 13.  Kendall also had about 130 head of cattle at the time.

Demographics

References

Archives of the Spokane Valley Heritage Museum

Unincorporated communities in Washington (state)
Unincorporated communities in Spokane County, Washington